Francis C. "Moose" Machinsky (September 15, 1934 – September 5, 2014) was an American gridiron football player who played for the Toronto Argonauts. He played college football at Ohio State University. He was named an all-star for the 1956 CFL season. He is a member of the Ohio State University Hall of Fame and Fayette County, Pennsylvania Sports Hall of Fame.

References

1934 births
2014 deaths
People from New Salem, Pennsylvania